Daniel Bramme (born 3 October 1984) is a Swedish film producer and businessman.

Early life and career
Born in Haninge, Stockholm, Daniel started working with film after graduating from Stockholms Filmskola (Stockholm Film school). Early in his career he mainly worked on music videos in Europe and Scandinavia, later in his career and after working at Swedish Trade Council (Business Sweden) he moved on to being more involved in feature films as a film executive. Daniel is known for working as a bridge between the film industry in the U.S. and Scandinavia, focusing on financing and distribution. In addition to his career as a film executive, he consults for numerous production companies and talks about film politics. Daniel is also known for writing and talking about gender equality in the film industry as well as being involved with animal welfare organizations and recently working with virtual reality and augmented reality productions.

References

External links 
 
 

1984 births
Living people
Swedish film producers
People from Haninge Municipality